HD 49947 (HR 2531) is a solitary star in the southern circumpolar constellation Volans. It has an apparent magnitude of 6.36, placing it near the max naked eye visibility. Parallax measurements place the object at a distance of 459 light years but is receding with a heliocentric radial velocity of 

HD 49947 has a stellar classification of G8 III and is a red clump giant, meaning that it is located on the warm end of the horizontal branch. HD 49947 is metal deficient with an iron abundance 68% that of Sun and spins very slowly.

References

G-type giants
Volans (constellation)
049947
032222
2531
Volantis, 3
CD-72 351